The 1988 Summer Olympics took place in Seoul, South Korea. The swimming competition, held from September 18 to September 25, was notable for the seven medals, including five golds, won by Matt Biondi, the six golds won by Kristin Otto, and the three individual golds won by Janet Evans.  633 participants from 77 countries were competing.

Medal table

Events 
The swimming program for 1988 included two new events, the men's and women's 50 m freestyle, bringing the total number of events to 31.

The following events were contested:

Freestyle: 50 m, 100 m, 200 m, 400 m, 800 m (women), 1500 m (men), 
Backstroke: 100 m, 200 m
Breaststroke: 100 m, 200 m
Butterfly: 100 m, 200 m
Individual Medley: 200 m, 400 m
Relay: 4 × 100 m free, 4 × 200 m free (men); 4 × 100 m medley

Competition schedule
All dates are in 1988.

Medal summary

Men’s events

* Swimmers who participated in the heats only and received medals.

Women’s events

* Swimmers who participated in the heats only and received medals.

Participating nations
633 swimmers from 77 nations competed.

References

 
1988 Summer Olympics events
1988
1988 in swimming